Luke Nelson (born September 16, 1980) is an American ski mountaineer.

Nelson attended the Blackfoot High School in Idaho, and studied at Idaho State University until 2006. He started skiing in 2005. He lives in Pocatello, Idaho.

Selected results 
 2012:
 2nd (and 4th in the World ranking), North American Championship, individual
 2nd (and 4th in the World ranking),  North American Championship, total ranking

References

External links 
 Luke Nelson at SkiMountaineers.org
 shot 2012-01-16 at 12.39.10 PM.png Photo (2012)
 Nelson's blog

1980 births
Living people
American male ski mountaineers
Sportspeople from Idaho